Chidi Blyden  is an American foreign policy advisor who serves as Deputy Assistant Secretary of Defense for African Affairs in the Biden administration. Previously, Blyden served in the Obama Administration at the Defense Department.

Education 
Blyden, originally from Sierra Leone, graduated from the Annie Walsh Memorial School. Later, she earned a Bachelor of Science degree in sociology from Texas A&M University and a Master of Science in conflict, analysis, and resolution  from the Carter School for Peace and Conflict Resolution at George Mason University. She speaks French and Krio.

Career 
Blyden began her national security career with the Africa Center for Strategic Studies. There, she managed academic programs and outreach. In 2013, Blyden joined the Obama Administration focusing on a peacekeeping advisor in the Office of Stability & Humanitarian Affairs at the United States Department of Defense. Later, she served as the special assistant to the Deputy Assistant Secretary of Defense for African Affairs.

After leaving government in 2017, Blyden lead the African program at the Center for Civilians in Conflict. In 2019, she joined the United States House Committee on Armed Services as a professional staff member.

In May 2021, Blyden was named as the Deputy Assistant Secretary of Defense for African Affairs.

References 

Living people
United States Department of Defense officials
Obama administration personnel
Biden administration personnel
Annie Walsh Memorial School alumni
Year of birth missing (living people)
Sierra Leone Creole people